Eurosta is a genus of gall maker flies in the family Tephritidae (known as fruit flies in North America and picture wing flies in Europe). There are seven species in the genus, all in North America.

Species
E. comma (Wiedemann, 1830)
E. cribrata (Wulp, 1867)
E. fenestrata Snow, 1894
E. floridensis Foote, 1977
E. lateralis (Wiedemann, 1830)
E. latifrons (Loew, 1862)
E. solidaginis (Fitch, 1855)

References

Tephritinae
Tephritidae genera
Taxa named by Hermann Loew
Diptera of North America